Trading Matters was a segment on CNBC television's CashFlow. It screened weekdays at 2:40AEDT. It provided viewers with live reports from the Australian Stock Exchange and analysis about the business scene down under.

In a previous incarnation it was a 30 minutes business news bulletin on CNBC that screened at 4pm Australian time on weekdays. The format was 'revised' to the shorter version at the end of 2009.

References

Australian television news shows
CNBC Asia original programming
CNBC Europe original programming
2007 Australian television series debuts
Business-related television series